The 2010–11 Segunda Divisão season was the 77th season of the competition and the 61st season of recognised third-tier football in Portugal.

Overview
The league was contested by 48 teams in 3 divisions with Padroense FC, União da Madeira and Atlético CP winning the respective divisional competitions and the latter two teams gaining promotion to the Liga de Honra.  The overall championship was won by União da Madeira.

League standings

Segunda Divisão - Zona Norte

Segunda Divisão - Zona Centro

Segunda Divisão - Zona Sul

Play-offs

Play-off table

Top goalscorers

Footnotes

External links
 Portuguese Division Two «B» - footballzz.co.uk

Portuguese Second Division seasons
Port
3